Ignacio Gili (born 30 June 1971) is an Argentine cyclist. He competed in the men's cross-country mountain biking event at the 2000 Summer Olympics.

References

1971 births
Living people
Argentine male cyclists
Olympic cyclists of Argentina
Cyclists at the 2000 Summer Olympics
Place of birth missing (living people)